Jocotenango Church or Iglesia de Jocotenango is a church in Jocotenango, Guatemala. 

Roman Catholic churches in Guatemala